Tevya is a 1939 American Yiddish film, based on author Sholem Aleichem's stock character Tevye the Dairyman, also the subject of the 1964 musical Fiddler on the Roof. It was the first non-English language picture selected for preservation by the National Film Registry.

Cast
 Maurice Schwartz as Tevya
 Miriam Riselle as Chava 
 Rebecca Weintraub as Golde 
 Paula Lubelski as Tzeitel 
 Leon Liebgold as Fedya 
 Vicki Marcus as Shloimele 
 Betty Marcus as Perele
 Julius Adler as Aleksei the Priest

Production
The script was adapted by Marcy Klauber and Schwartz from Sholem Aleichem's play based on his own book. Schwartz directed the film, which was based on two works by Schwartz from 1919: the silent film Broken Barriers (Khavah) and the stage production of Tevye.

The production was filmed at Biograph Studios in New York City and on a farm in Jericho, New York. Midway through the shooting of the film, Hitler seized Danzig on August 23, 1939, and a Nazi invasion of Poland was imminent. These and other events in Europe affected the actors, many of whom had family in Poland. The filming, however, was completed.

The story focuses primarily on Sholem Aleichem's stories "Chava" and "Lekh-Lekho (Get Thee Out)" but provides a definite ending rather than Sholom Aleichem's ambiguous ending. In this version of Tevya, as the Jews are expelled from their shtetl, Chava who previously converted to Christianity to marry, leaves her husband, returns to her family and to Judaism. It is felt that the antisemitism of the time influenced Schwartz to provide this ending.

Rediscovery
Long thought to be a lost film, a print was discovered in 1978. The same story was the basis of the 1964 stage musical Fiddler on the Roof and its 1971 film version, but the fate of Chava in the ending was changed for the change in attitudes by that time.

In 1991, Tevya was the first non-English language film to be named "culturally, historically, or aesthetically significant" by the U.S. Library of Congress and selected for preservation in the National Film Registry.

See also
List of rediscovered films
1939 in film

References

External links
Tevye essay  by J. Hoberman at  National Film Registry
Tevye essay by Daniel Eagan in   America's Film Legacy: The Authoritative Guide to the Landmark Movies in the National Film Registry, A&C Black, 2010 , pages 302-304.

 Marat Grinberg, Rolling in Dust: Maurice Schwartz's Tevye (1939) And Its Ambiguities.
 Thomas Pryor, A Ukrainian Village Is Erected on a Long Island Farm for a Yiddish Film Drama, New York Times, 30 July 1939.

1939 films
1939 drama films
1930s independent films
United States National Film Registry films
American black-and-white films
Films about Jews and Judaism
Films based on short fiction
Yiddish-language films
1930s rediscovered films
Adaptations of works by Sholem Aleichem
American drama films
Films about Orthodox and Hasidic Jews
Rediscovered American films
1930s American films